Francine Jordi (born Francine Lehmann, 24 June 1977) is a Swiss pop singer.

As a young child, she sang songs for Japanese tourists in Interlaken. With this musical background she won the German Grand Prix der Volksmusik in 1998 with the song "Das Feuer der Sehnsucht". Jordi subsequently became a star in Switzerland with chart success singing mostly in German and leading to golden records and tours throughout not only Switzerland, but also Germany and Austria. She hosted two TV shows at the ARD. In 2002, she represented Switzerland at the Eurovision Song Contest in Tallinn with a French language song "Dans le jardin de mon âme". In autumn that year, she made a solo tour with her band in Switzerland.

As of September 2015, Jordi has been presenter of the long-running TV show, Musikantenstadl.

Albums discography
 1998: Das Feuer der Sehnsucht
 1999: Ein Märchen aus Eis
 2000: Wunschlos glücklich
 2001: Verliebt in das Leben
 2002: Im Garten meiner Seele
 2003: Alles steht und fällt mit Dir
 2004: Einfach Francine Jordi (compilation)
 2005: Halt mich
 2007: Dann kamst du
 2009: Meine kleine grosse Welt
 2011: Lago Maggiore (with Florian Ast)
 2013: Verliebt geliebt
 2015: Wir
 2016: Nur für dich
 2018: Noch lange nicht genug
 2021: Herzfarben

References

External links

 Official website 

1977 births
Living people
People from Worb
Eurovision Song Contest entrants for Switzerland
Eurovision Song Contest entrants of 2002
20th-century Swiss women singers
21st-century Swiss women singers